Yu Zhiying (born 23 November 1997) is a Chinese professional go player and, the highest ranked Chinese female player with an ELO rating of 3309.

In 2015 she won her first international, the 6th Bingsheng Cup.

Promotion record

References

1997 births
Living people
Chinese Go players
Female Go players